The 2017 Polish Speedway season was the 2017 season of motorcycle speedway in Poland.

Individual

Polish Individual Speedway Championship
The 2017 Individual Speedway Polish Championship final was held on 2 July at Gorzów. Szymon Woźniak won the Polish Championship.

Golden Helmet
The 2017 Golden Golden Helmet organised by the Polish Motor Union (PZM) was the 2017 event for the league's leading riders. The final was held at Zielona Góra on the 20 April. Przemysław Pawlicki won the Golden Helmet.

Junior Championship
 winner - Bartosz Smektała

Silver Helmet
 winner - Maksym Drabik

Bronze Helmet
 winners - Dominik Kubera, Wiktor Lis, Bartosz Smektała

Pairs

Polish Pairs Speedway Championship
The 2017 Polish Pairs Speedway Championship was the 2017 edition of the Polish Pairs Speedway Championship. The final was held on 23 July at Ostrów Wielkopolski.

Team

Team Speedway Polish Championship
The 2017 Team Speedway Polish Championship was the 2017 edition of the Team Polish Championship. Unia Leszno won the gold medal. The team included Emil Saifutdinov, Janusz Kołodziej, Piotr Pawlicki Jr. and Bartosz Smektała.

Ekstraliga

Play offs

1.Liga

Play offs

2.Liga

Play offs

References

Poland Individual
Poland Team
Speedway
2017 in Polish speedway